Maldon is a town in Essex, England.

Maldon may also refer to:

Places
 Maldon District, a local government district based in Maldon, Essex
 Maldon & Tiptree F.C., an English football club
 Maldon (UK Parliament constituency)
 Maldon Marine Lake
 Battle of Maldon, between English and Viking forces in 991 AD
 "The Battle of Maldon", an Old English poem inspired by the battle
 Maldon, New South Wales, a rural locality in Australia
 Maldon, Victoria, "Australia's First Notable Town"

Other
 "Maldòn", a 1990 song recorded by Zouk Machine
 Maldon Sea Salt company, sea salt produced in Maldon, Essex

See also
 Malden (disambiguation)